Coming Through the Rye is a 2015 American coming-of-age drama film written and directed by James Steven Sadwith.  It stars Alex Wolff and Stefania LaVie Owen as two teenagers who set out to find author J. D. Salinger, played by Chris Cooper.  The film is based on Sadwith's own quest to find Salinger.  It is Sadwith's directorial debut.

Plot
In 1969, Jamie Schwartz has written a play adaptation of J.D. Salinger's 1951 novel The Catcher in the Rye and wants to produce it at his prep school in Pennsylvania.  In order to do that, Jamie needs permission from Salinger himself.  Therefore, Jamie, with the help of DeeDee, travels to New Hampshire in order to find Salinger and obtain his permission.

Cast
Alex Wolff as Jamie Schwartz
Stefania LaVie Owen as DeeDee
Chris Cooper as J. D. Salinger
Jacob Leinbach as Hank Marcus
Eric Nelsen as Ted Tyler
Kabby Borders as Maureen
Zephyr Benson as Gerry Schwartz
Adrian Pasdar as Mr. Tierney
Matthew Keating as Matthew Keating

Production
Sadwith says that the film is a mostly-accurate reflection of what he experienced in his real life. He explains, "The movie is about eighty-five percent accurate with what happened up to the moment when I went to search for J.D. Salinger, and from that point it’s about ninety-nine percent accurate." On November 5, 2014, it was announced that Cooper would portray Salinger in this film.  On November 6, 2014, Zephyr Benson was cast in the film.  The film was shot on location in and around Woodberry Forest School, and the nearby town, Orange, Virginia as well as Madison, VA.  It was also filmed in the Shenandoah Valley.

Release
The film made its worldwide premiere at the 2015 Austin Film Festival.  The film made its wide release on October 14, 2016 by Eammon Films and Samuel Goldwyn Films.

Reception
The film has a 70% rating on Rotten Tomatoes.

Barbara Van Denburgh of The Arizona Republic gave the film two and a half stars out of five.

Godfrey Cheshire of RogerEbert.com gave the film three stars.

S. Jhoanna Robledo of Common Sense Media gave the film three stars out of five.

Tricia Olszewski of TheWrap referred to the film as "a sweet and inviting road trip, taking place in the colorful fall and accompanied by an indie soundtrack that lulls. It’s also a trip back in time, offering the now-archaic sound of a typewriter’s taps and the quaintness of a period in which a man and woman had to be married to secure a motel room. The fledgling relationship between Jamie and Deedee is touching, too, with both actors giving natural if not outstanding performances."

Stephen Farber of The Hollywood Reporter wrote "Sadwith works expertly with all of the castmembers, and he also brings visual flair to the pastoral scenes in New Hampshire. Eric Hurt’s cinematography is a strong asset. Sadwith’s writing is equally perceptive."

Sheri Linden of the Los Angeles Times wrote a negative review, stating that the film "feels like standard teen angst."

References

External links
 
 
 

2015 films
American coming-of-age drama films
Films set in 1969
Films shot in Virginia
Films set in Pennsylvania
Films set in New Hampshire
Samuel Goldwyn Films films
Drama films based on actual events
2010s coming-of-age drama films
2015 directorial debut films
2015 drama films
J. D. Salinger
2010s English-language films
Films directed by James Steven Sadwith
2010s American films